Emerson Cris Hartkopp (born 22 January 1978), known as Emerson Cris or simply Emerson, is a Brazilian football manager and former player who played as a defensive midfielder. He is the current manager of Concórdia.

Career
Born in Curitiba, Paraná, Emerson finished his formation with Paraná and started his senior career while on loan at Grêmio Maringá in 1997. Upon returning, he started to feature sparingly with the first team in the Série A.

Emerson left the club in December 2003, and failed to settle with any club in the remainder of his career. He represented Criciúma, Sport, Gama, Al-Sharjah, Joinville, Bahia, Chapecoense, Anapolina and CRAC; he retired with the latter in 2013.

Emerson returned to Chapecoense in 2014, as a manager of the under-20 squad. He became the assistant manager of the main squad in 2017, and after the dismissal of Vinícius Eutrópio in September of that year, he was named manager in an interim manner.

In March 2019, after the sacking of Claudinei Oliveira, Emerson was again interim, but returned to his previous role shortly after the appointment of Ney Franco.

References

External links
Futebol de Goyaz profile 

1978 births
Living people
Footballers from Curitiba
Brazilian footballers
Association football midfielders
Campeonato Brasileiro Série A players
Campeonato Brasileiro Série B players
Campeonato Brasileiro Série C players
Campeonato Brasileiro Série D players
Paraná Clube players
Grêmio de Esportes Maringá players
Criciúma Esporte Clube players
Sport Club do Recife players
Sociedade Esportiva do Gama players
Joinville Esporte Clube players
Esporte Clube Bahia players
Associação Chapecoense de Futebol players
Associação Atlética Anapolina players
Clube Recreativo e Atlético Catalano players
UAE Pro League players
Sharjah FC players
Brazilian expatriate footballers
Brazilian expatriate sportspeople in the United Arab Emirates
Expatriate footballers in the United Arab Emirates
Brazilian football managers
Campeonato Brasileiro Série A managers
Associação Chapecoense de Futebol managers